Vatican Conspiracy or Morte in Vaticano is a 1982 Italian film directed by Marcello Aliprandi. It stars Terence Stamp, Fabrizio Bentivoglio and Gabriele Ferzetti.

Cast
Terence Stamp as Padre Andreani
Fabrizio Bentivoglio as Padre Bruno Martello
Paula Molina as Nina
Gabriele Ferzetti as Cardinale Ixaguirre
José Luis López Vázquez as Don Perrone
Antonio Marsina as Vittorio
Roberto Antonelli as Patrick La Place 		
Adriano Amidei Migliano as Dottore
Eduardo Fajardo as Rettore

References

External links

1982 films
1980s Italian-language films
Films about Catholicism
1982 drama films
Italian drama films
Films scored by Pino Donaggio
1980s Italian films